Nicolville is an unincorporated community in Mower County, Minnesota, United States. The community is on a side road, approximately one quarter mile north of I-90 and approximately three miles east of Austin.

Notes

Unincorporated communities in Mower County, Minnesota
Unincorporated communities in Minnesota